Alde may refer to:

 Alde Mudflats, a reserve in Suffolk, England
 River Alde, a river in Suffolk, England
 Alde Valley School, a school in Leiston, Suffolk, England
Alliance of Liberals and Democrats in Europe group, a political party in the European Parliament
Alliance of Liberals and Democrats, a political party in Romania

People with the name
 Edward Allde, English printer 
 Alda of Alania, 11th-century Alan princess
 John Allde, Scottish stationer and printer
 Yvette Alde (1911-1967), French artist

See also
 ALDE (disambiguation)